Slí Beatha (shlee-baha) is a hybrid martial art created in the United States in 1996 by Craig Smith. Smith developed it based on concepts of Celtic philosophy The style is similar to military combatives and places a focus on striking techniques, but includes grappling techniques for self-defense. It has no connection to any traditional Irish martial arts.

History

Sli Beatha was first taught in Warrensburg, Missouri in the Fall of 1996.  Classes were later taught at the local Central Missouri State University (now the University of Central Missouri) as part of the Central Martial Arts Club. The Mizzou Martial Arts Club (2000-2005) formed at the University of Missouri in Columbia by Duane Hamacher to teach classes in Sli Beatha.  The application of Sli Beatha to Mixed Martial Arts allowed the club to sponsor tournaments and events in Pankration which attracted a wide range of students.  The Mizzou Pankration Team was formed in 2001 as part of the club to compete in and host Pankration/MMA tournaments, seminars, and events.

In 2001, a Sli Beatha student, Lee Whitaker, won the women's division of the World Pankration Championships in Chicago  In 2002, the Mizzou Pankration Team was designated as a Champion Team by the World Pankration Federation after placing first or second in overall team winnings at all tournaments in which they competed.

Sli Beatha founder 
Sli Beatha founder, Craig Smith, was a police and special operations officer, publisher and editor-in-chief of Grandmaster Magazine (1996-2002), Director of SAFELIFE, and president of the World Pankration Federation.

From 1996-2003, Smith published Grandmaster Magazine, a magazine dedicated to martial arts, fitness, and combat sports, based in Kansas City.

Outside credit

Sli Beatha also credits training, support, and guidance from Jim 'Ronin' Harrison, a  Triple Crown martial arts champion (Karate, Judo, and Kickboxing) during the 1960s.

References

External links
Sli Beatha

Hybrid martial arts
North American martial arts
Martial arts in the United States